Western United Football Club Youth is the youth system of Western United Football Club based in Truganina, Melbourne. The youth team plays in the National Premier Leagues Victoria 2, the second level of Victorian soccer. The club also fields Diogo Ferreira is the current youth manager. The club also fields under-21s, under-18s, and three other academy teams within the NPL Victoria system.

History

Formation
The team was founded in 2020, with Ante Moric being announced as the inaugural head coach for the 2021 season. The clubs training base are at City Vista Recreation Reserve at Fraser Rise, Victoria.

Youth current squad
''These players can also play with the senior squad and compete in the NPL Victoria 2.

Current staff
.

See also
 Western United FC

References

External links
 Official website

Western United FC
National Premier Leagues clubs
Soccer clubs in Melbourne
Association football clubs established in 2020
2020 establishments in Australia
A-League National Youth League
Sport in the City of Melton